Tay Li Leng (born 13 February 1982) is a Malaysian swimmer. She competed in the women's 100 metre breaststroke event at the 1996 Summer Olympics.

References

1982 births
Living people
Malaysian female swimmers
Olympic swimmers of Malaysia
Swimmers at the 1996 Summer Olympics
Place of birth missing (living people)